Fear of God II: Let Us Pray is the major record label debut and extended play by American rapper Pusha T, released on November 8, 2011, under G.O.O.D. Music. The EP was his first project with Kanye West's GOOD Music label, since the announcement of his signing in September 2010. Pusha T claims his inspiration for Fear of God is that a vast majority of the people who he came in the music business with are in prison: "I came in the game with super producers. We made hit records. I never thought that it gets deeper. But not for nothing, 2009 I lost eight of my friends to incarceration. Everybody that I came in to the rap game with, and when I realized that those components weren't there anymore, the 'Fear of God' really came over me. It's full of the dichotomy of 'right and wrong' and 'good and evil'. A lot of it deals with greed. A lot of it deals with instant gratification. Personally... life without instant gratification... I don't know what it is."

Background and release
Pusha T established his solo career in mid-2010, while still in the Clipse with Malice, appearing on songs "Runaway" and "So Appalled" by Kanye West, propagating his features. On March 21, 2011, Pusha T released his first solo work, a mixtape titled Fear of God. Released independently, it included features from Kanye West, 50 Cent, Rick Ross, Pharrell Williams and Kevin Cossom. The EP is a re-release of the mixtape, which has different structure, production and additional tracks. The EP was originally set to be released on June 21, 2011, it was than pushed back to August 23, and for a while September 27, 2011, was believed to be the date, however on October 6, 2011, Thornton announced the EP is set to drop November 8, 2011. In addition it was revealed he added four more songs to the EP making it 12 tracks rather than just the nine tracks that were previously announced. To begin promoting the album, he released a track produced by The Neptunes, titled "Trouble on My Mind", which features the frontman of rap collective Odd Future, Tyler, the Creator. The track "Everything That Glitters" featuring French Montana is also included on DJ Drama's third album Third Power (2011). The song "Amen" was originally meant for Young Jeezy and "Raid" was originally meant for 50 Cent for his third album Curtis (2007). "What Dreams Are Made of" samples a Ric Flair promo.

Singles 
The album plays lead and Pusha T's debut single is "Trouble on My Mind", featuring Tyler, the Creator. Released on July 12, 2011, the song was structured in two verses by both rappers. The second single "Amen" featuring Kanye West and Young Jeezy was released August 11, 2011.

Reception

Critical response 
Fear of God II: Let Us Pray received generally positive reviews from music critics. At Metacritic, which assigns a normalized rating out of 100 to reviews from mainstream critics, the album received an average score of 69, based on 17 reviews, which indicates "generally favorable reviews". In his consumer guide for MSN Music, critic Robert Christgau gave it an A– rating, indicating "the kind of garden-variety good record that is the great luxury of musical micromarketing and overproduction." Christgau quipped in his review, "The grand beats are safer than the clenched, confining, arrogantly hookless minimalism of Hell Hath No Fury. But every mean word delivers, and with cameos from Tyler the Creator to 50 Cent it's as if he never went solo."

Commercial performance
The album debuted at number 66 on the Billboard 200 with 8,900 copies sold in its first week released. It also entered at number ten on Billboards R&B/Hip-Hop Albums, at number eight on Billboards Top Rap Albums, and at number 25 on its Digital Albums chart. On the second week of its release the album sold 4,300 copies, bringing the total to 13,000 copies.

Track listing

Personnel 

Sean "Puffy" Combs – Composer
P. Williams – Composer
The Neptunes – Producer
Kevin Cossom - Composer
Kanye West – Composer
Nottz – Producer
Shawty Redd – Producer
Fabian Marasciullo – Mixing
Emeka Alams – Design
Jason Goldwatch – Photography
Tha Bizness – Producer
Hit-Boy – Producer
Dave Kutch – Mastering
Lee Major – Producer
Deezy – Producer

Shondrae "Mr. Bangladesh" Crawford – Producer
Steven Victor – A&R
Terrence Thornton – Composer
Terrence Thornton – Executive Producer
Terrence Thornton – A&R
Rennard East – Executive Producer
Rennard East – A&R
Elizabeth Gallardo – Assistant Engineer
Rico Beats – Producer
Rashid Anthony – Composer
Rashid Anthony – Producer
Omar Dubois – Creative Director
The VIP's – Producer

Charts

References

External links

2011 debut EPs
Hip hop EPs
Pusha T albums
GOOD Music EPs
Albums produced by Bangladesh (record producer)
Albums produced by Hit-Boy
Albums produced by Nottz
Albums produced by Shawty Redd
Albums produced by Tha Bizness
Albums produced by the Neptunes
Albums produced by Left Brain
Sequel albums
Albums produced by the Inkredibles